The Haima 3 is a compact car produced in China from 2007 to 2013 under the Haima brand, a joint venture between the Hainan provincial government and Mazda.

Overview
The Haima 3 was based on the same platform as the ninth generation Mazda Familia/323 with a completely restyled body still heavily inspired by the Mazda3 but is unrelated. A 1.6 and 1.8 litre engine was available paired to a 5 speed manual or CVT gearbox. The Haima 3 replaced the Haima Family sedan which is a rebadged Mazda 323 produced by Haima. However, the facelift model in 2011 was renamed to Haima Family again with prices ranging from 79,800 yuan to 84,800 yuan.

References

External links 

 Haima official website

Haima vehicles
Compact cars
Hatchbacks
Sedans
Front-wheel-drive vehicles
Cars introduced in 2007
Cars of China